Farra may refer to:

Astronomy

7501 Farra, an asteroid orbiting in the outer asteroid belt
Farra (Venus), flat-topped volcanic features of the planet Venus

Geography
Farra, County Armagh, a townland in County Armagh, Northern Ireland
Farra, an Italian civil parish of Mel, Veneto
Farra d'Alpago, an Italian municipality of the Province of Belluno, Veneto
Farra di Soligo, an Italian municipality of the Province of Treviso, Veneto
Farra d'Isonzo, an Italian municipality of the Province of Gorizia, Friuli-Venezia Giulia

Other Uses
Farra N. Hyte, Miss Continental Plus 2013

See also
Fara (disambiguation)
Farah (disambiguation)